Noorul Hassan Tanvir is a Pakistani politician who has been a member of the National Assembly of Pakistan since August 2018.

Political career
He was elected to the National Assembly of Pakistan from Constituency NA-169 (Bahawalnagar-IV) as a candidate of Pakistan Muslim League (N) in 2018 Pakistani general election by obtaining 91763 votes. On  February 2, 2019 a petition was filed to disqualify Tanvir under Article 62(1)(f) of the Constitution over alleged possession of a work residency in the UAE, as well as bank accounts there, neither of which he had disclosed in his nomination papers during the 2018 general polls.

References

Living people
Punjabi people
Pakistani MNAs 2018–2023
Pakistan Muslim League (N) politicians
Year of birth missing (living people)